Emílio de Mello (born 14 July 1965) is a Brazilian actor. In 2015, the actor was nominated for an International Emmy Awards for Best Actor, for his starring role in the Series Psi

Selected filmography
TV
2015 - Sete Vidas - Vinícius
2014 - Geração Brasil - Fernando
2014–present - Psi - Carlo Antonini
2012 - Lado a Lado - Carlos Guerra
2011 - Cordel Encantado - General Baldini
2010 - Dalva e Herivelto: uma Canção de Amor - Benedito Lacerda
2008 - Ó Paí, Ó - Lacerda
2008 - Queridos Amigos - Guto (Luís Augusto Souza Tavares)
2006 - JK - Carlos Murilo
2004 - Histórias de Cama e Mesa - Ronaldo Cunha
1994 - Pátria Minha - Hélio Pastor
1992 - Anos Rebeldes - Toledo

Films
2004 - O Veneno da Madrugada - Roberto Assis
2004 - Cazuza – O Tempo Não Pára - Zeca (Ezequiel Neves)
2002 - Lara - Luigi
2002 - Querido Estranho - Betinho
2001 - Amores Possíveis - Pedro
2000 - Villa-Lobos - Uma Vida de Paixão - Arthur Rubinstein
2017 - Motorrad''

Awards

References

External links

1965 births
Living people
Brazilian male television actors
Brazilian male telenovela actors
Brazilian male film actors
Male actors from São Paulo